Dr. Victor McBrayer House, also known as Owen House, is a historic home located near Shelby, Cleveland County, North Carolina.  It was built in 1893, and is a -story, modified "U"-plan, eclectic frame dwelling with Italianate, Gothic Revival, and Queen Anne style design elements. It features a rich array of sawn and turned ornament.

It was listed on the National Register of Historic Places in 1979.

References

Houses on the National Register of Historic Places in North Carolina
Italianate architecture in North Carolina
Gothic Revival architecture in North Carolina
Queen Anne architecture in North Carolina
Houses completed in 1893
Houses in Cleveland County, North Carolina
National Register of Historic Places in Cleveland County, North Carolina